Fabiano de Lima Campos Maria (born 24 November 1985), simply known as Fabiano, is a Brazilian football player who plays as striker.

Career
Fabiano signed a one-year deal for SK Rapid Wien on free transfer in summer 2007, he came from Ponte Preta. In April 2008, he was awarded another year on his contract. In September 2010 Fabiano agreed one-year deal with Aris. In March 2011 he signed a one-year deal for FC Metalurh Zaporizhya as free agent.

In 2018 he featured for Birkirkara F.C.

References

External links
 Brazilian FA Database  
 

1985 births
Living people
People from São José dos Campos
Brazilian footballers
Brazilian expatriate footballers
Expatriate footballers in Austria
Expatriate footballers in Greece
Expatriate footballers in Ukraine
Brazilian expatriate sportspeople in Austria
Brazilian expatriate sportspeople in Ukraine
Association football forwards
Associação Atlética Ponte Preta players
SK Rapid Wien players
FC Wacker Innsbruck (2002) players
Aris Thessaloniki F.C. players
FC Metalurh Zaporizhzhia players
LASK players
Austrian Football Bundesliga players
Super League Greece players
Ukrainian Premier League players
Footballers from São Paulo (state)
Brazilian expatriate sportspeople in Greece
Brazilian expatriate sportspeople in Malta